Centrodraco otohime is a species of fish in the family Draconettidae, the slope dragonets. It is found in the Northwest Pacific Ocean.

Size

Etymology
The fish is named for Otohime, the Princess of the Dragon Palace, Ryūgū-jō, which is at the bottom of the sea, in the Japanese fairy tale Urashima Tarō.

References

Fish of the Pacific Ocean
Taxa named by Tetsuji Nakabo
Taxa named by Eiichi Yamamoto
Fish described in 1980
Draconettidae